Raymond Alfred Dalton (14 July 1919 – 2 February 1997) was a New Zealand rugby union player. A prop, Dalton represented Wellington and Otago at a provincial level, and was a member of the New Zealand national side, the All Blacks, between 1947 and 1949. He played 20 matches—three as captain—for the All Blacks, including two internationals.

During World War II, Dalton served as a navigator with the Royal New Zealand Air Force, based in the United Kingdom. In August 1942 he was commissioned as an air observer with the rank of pilot officer, in February 1943 he was promoted to flying officer, and in August 1944 he gained the rank of flight lieutenant. While in the air force, Dalton played 31 first-class matches for services rugby teams.

Dalton died in Auckland on 2 February 1997, and his ashes were buried at Purewa Cemetery.

References

1919 births
1997 deaths
People from Te Awamutu
New Zealand rugby union players
New Zealand international rugby union players
Wellington rugby union players
Otago rugby union players
Rugby union props
New Zealand military personnel of World War II
Burials at Purewa Cemetery
Rugby union players from Waikato
People educated at Te Awamutu College